Andrey or Andrei Gorokhov may refer to:

 Andrey Gorokhov (politician) (born 1960), Russian politician
 Andrey Gorokhov (bobsledder) (born 1968), Russian bobsledder